Sphingomyelin phosphodiesterase 1 (SMPD1), also known as acid sphingomyelinase (ASM), is an enzyme that in humans is encoded by the SMPD1 gene.

Sphingomyelin phosphodiesterase 1 belongs to the sphingomyelin phosphodiesterase family.

Clinical significance 

Defects in SMPD1 gene cause Niemann-Pick disease, SMPD1-associated.

A L302P mutation in the SMPD1 gene as a risk factor for Parkinson disease.

References

Further reading

External links 
  GeneReviews/NCBI/NIH/UW entry on Acid Sphingomyelinase Deficiency Includes: Niemann-Pick Disease Type A, Niemann-Pick Disease Type B
  OMIM entries on Acid Sphingomyelinase Deficiency